The Chelungpu Fault Preservation Park is a park in Zhushan Township, Nantou County, Taiwan established to commemorate the 21 September 1999 earthquake. It is the subordinate park to the National Museum of Natural Science.

History
The establishment of the museum begin in November 2002 when Dr. Wen-shan Chen, a professor of geology from National Taiwan University, discovered the original Chelungpu Fault caused by the earthquake in 1999 while conducting his investigation into the major earthquakes that struck Taiwan over the past years. The Chelungpu Fault Preservation Park was created to preserve the fault and was opened to the public for testing operation on 30 January 2013 and officially opened for regular operation on 1 May the same year.

Exhibition
The gallery displays the thrust fault caused by the 1999 earthquake. It also displays various aspects of geological science in its Geoscience Hall, such as fossils, trench layers etc.

See also
 921 Earthquake Museum of Taiwan
 National Museum of Natural Science
 List of tourist attractions in Taiwan

References

External links

 

2013 establishments in Taiwan
Buildings and structures completed in 2013
Buildings and structures in Nantou County
Tourist attractions in Nantou County
1999 Jiji earthquake
Geoparks in Taiwan